Goodnight & Goodluck may refer to:

"Goodnight & Goodluck", a song by Reks from More Grey Hairs
"Goodnight & Goodluck", a song by Nothing's Carved in Stone from Echo
"Goodnight & Goodluck", a song by the Wise Guys of which JD Era was a member

See also
 Good Night, and Good Luck, a 2005 film by George Clooney